The 2017 Cincinnati Bengals season was the franchise's 48th season in the National Football League, their 50th overall and their 15th under head coach Marvin Lewis. After starting 0–2, scoring only 9 points, and not scoring any touchdowns in their first two games, the Bengals fired offensive coordinator Ken Zampese. Quarterbacks coach Bill Lazor was promoted to offensive coordinator to replace Zampese. The Bengals suffered back to back losing seasons for the first time since 2007–2008. However, the Bengals were able to knock off two teams contending for the playoffs at the end of their season, the Detroit Lions in Week 16, and the Baltimore Ravens in Week 17 which helped the Buffalo Bills reach the postseason for the first time since 1999.

Offseason

Free agents

Unrestricted

Restricted and Exclusive-Rights

Signings

Departures

Draft

Staff

Final roster

Preseason

Regular season

Schedule

Note: Intra-division opponents are in bold text.

Game summaries

Week 1: vs. Baltimore Ravens

The Bengals started the season at home against the Ravens.  In the first quarter, the Ravens scored as Justin Tucker kicked a 25-yard field goal to make it 3–0.  They would increase their lead in the second quarter when Joe Flacco found Jeremy Maclin on a 48-yard pass to make it 10–0.  This would be followed up by a 2-yard touchdown run by Terrence West to make the score 17–0 at halftime.  In the third quarter, the Ravens would go back to work with Tucker kicking yet another 25-yard field goal to make the score 20–0.  A scoreless fourth quarter made this the eventual final score of the game.

With the loss, the Bengals started their season 0–1.  This is the team's first shut-out loss at home since 2001.

Andy Dalton set a new career high for total turnovers in a game with 5 (4 interceptions, 1 lost fumble)

Week 2: vs. Houston Texans

The Bengals stayed home for a Thursday Night duel against the Texans.  In the first quarter the Texans jumped out to an early lead when Ka'imi Fairbairn kicked a 26-yard field goal to make it 3–0.  The Bengals tied it up in the second quarter when Randy Bullock kicked a 39-yard field goal to make it 3–3.  Though the Texans would then retake the lead when DeShaun Watson ran for a 49-yard touchdown to make it 10–3.  Bullock closed out the first half scoring with a 29-yard field goal to make it 10–6 at halftime.  In the third quarter, the Bengals went back to work when Bullock kicked a 30-yard field goal to get his team within a point making the score 10–9.  In the fourth quarter, the Texans moved ahead by 4 after Fairbairn kicked a 42-yard field goal to make it 13–9.  The Bengals tried to come back with seconds left but after a failed fourth down conversion attempt, the Texans were able to seal the victory.

With the loss, the Bengals dropped to 0–2.  This would be the team's first 0–2 start since 2008. They are also the first team to open a season with two home games without scoring a touchdown since the 1939 Eagles.

Week 3: at Green Bay Packers

The Bengals traveled Lambeau Field to take on the Packers.  In the first quarter, the Bengals scored first when Andy Dalton found A. J. Green on a 10-yard pass to make it 7–0.  Though the Packers would respond by tying the game up at 7–7 when Aaron Rodgers found Lance Kendricks on a 1-yard pass.  In the second quarter, it was all Bengals when Dalton found Giovani Bernard on a 6-yard pass to make it 14–7.  This would be followed up by Cornerback William Jackson III intercepting Rodgers and returning it 75 yards for a touchdown to make it 21–7 at halftime.  In the third quarter, the Packers got to work as Rodgers would find Jordy Nelson on a 1-yard pass to make it 21–14.  They would draw closer in the fourth quarter after Mason Crosby kicked a 28-yard field goal to make it 21–17.  The Bengals then moved ahead by a touchdown again after Randy Bullock kicked a 46-yard field goal to make it 24–17.  However, the Packers tied it up later on when Rodgers and Nelson connected again this time on a 3-yard pass to make it 24–24.  In overtime, the Bengals won the toss but went three-and-out. After the Packers got the ball, Rodgers found Geronimo Allison on a 72-yard pass that set up Mason Crosby's game-winning field goal from 27 yards out to make the final score 27–24.

With the loss, the Bengals fell to 0–3.  The team would face their first 0–3 start since 2008.

Week 4: at Cleveland Browns

After a tough loss, the Bengals traveled to Cleveland to take on the Browns in Round 1 of Battle of Ohio.  After a scoreless first quarter, the Bengals got to work in the second quarter when Andy Dalton found A. J. Green on a 7-yard pass to make the score 7–0.  Dalton would then find Tyler Kroft on a 3-yard pass to make it 14–0.  Then Dalton would find Giovani Bernard on a 61-yard pass to make it 21–0 at halftime.  In the third quarter, the Bengals increased their lead when Randy Bullock nailed a 41-yard field goal to make it 24–0.  This would be followed by Dalton's fourth touchdown pass of the day as he found Kroft again this time on a 16-yard pass to make it 31–0.  In the fourth quarter, the Browns got the final points of the game when Duke Johnson ran for a 1-yard touchdown making the final score 31–7.

With the win, the Bengals improved to 1–3.

Week 5: vs. Buffalo Bills

After a huge road win, the Bengals returned home for a game against the Bills.  The Bengals would draw first blood in the first quarter when Andy Dalton found A. J. Green on a 77-yard pass to make it 7–0.  The Bills scored a field goal later on in the quarter when Stephen Hauschka kicked a 31-yard field goal to make it 7-3.  The Bengals moved up by a touchdown in the second quarter when Randy Bullock nailed a 30-yard field goal to make it 10–3.  Though the Bills would tie it up later on in the quarter when Tyrod Taylor connected with Brandon Tate for a 12-yard pass making the score 10–10 at halftime.  In the third quarter, the Bills moved into the lead with another field goal from Hauschka.  This was from 38 yards out to make the score 13–10.  In the fourth quarter, the Bengals retook the lead when Joe Mixon ran for a 5-yard touchdown making it 17–13.  Hauschka got the Bills closer with a 28-yard field goal to make it 17–16.  Though later on, Bullock kicked a 29-yard field goal making the score 20–16.  This would be the eventual final score of the game.

With the win, the Bengals went into their bye week at 2–3.

Week 7: at Pittsburgh Steelers

Coming off their bye week, the Bengals traveled to Pittsburgh for Game 1 against the division rival Steelers. The Steelers would score first when Ben Roethlisberger found Antonio Brown on a 7-yard pass to make it 7–0. Though later on in the quarter, the Bengals would tie it up when Andy Dalton found Brandon LaFell on a 6-yard pass to make it a 7–7 game. In the second quarter, the Steelers moved back into the lead when Roethlisberger found JuJu Smith-Schuster on a 31-yard pass to make it 14–7. But the Bengals tied it up again when Dalton found Tyler Kroft on a 1-yard pass making it 14–14. The Steelers closed the half with 2 field goals kicked by Chris Boswell: From 22 and 24 yards out to retake the lead 17–14 and then make it 20–14 at halftime. In the highly defensive second half, the Steelers managed to score more field goals starting in the third quarter when Boswell went for 2 more: From 41 and 49 yards out to increase the Steelers' lead from 9 to 12 and making the score change from 23–14 to 26–14. In the last quarter, the Steelers would pretty much seal the game when Boswell hit his fifth field goal of the game from 29-yards out to make the final score 29–14.

With their fifth straight loss to the Steelers, the Bengals dropped to 2–4.

Week 8: vs. Indianapolis Colts

After a tough loss, the Bengals returned home for a game against the Colts.  The Bengals jumped out to an early lead in the first quarter when Randy Bullock kicked a 29-yard field goal to make it 3–0.  This would be the only score of the quarter.  In the second quarter the Colts scored 10 unanswered points and took the lead when at first they would tie it up with Adam Vinatieri's 29-yard field goal to make it 3–3 followed up by Jacoby Brissett finding Jack Doyle on a 13-yard pass to make it 10–3.  The Bengals tied it up later on in the quarter when Andy Dalton found A. J. Green on an 8-yard pass to make it 10–10.  But the Colts would move ahead at halftime with Vinatieri finishing up with a 33-yard field goal to make it 13–10.  In the third quarter, the Bengals retook the lead 17–13 when Dalton found Josh Malone on a 25-yard pass.  Though the Colts took the lead back afterwards when Brissett found Marlon Mack on a 24-yard pass making it 20–17.  In the fourth quarter, the Colts increased their lead when Vinatieri kicked yet another 29-yard field goal to make it 23–17.  Though the Bengals would eventually seal the victory when Brissett was intercepted by Carlos Dunlap and it was returned for a 16-yard touchdown to make the final score 24–23.

With the win, the Bengals improved to 3–4.

Week 9: at Jacksonville Jaguars

After winning at home, the Bengals traveled down south to take on the Jaguars.  The Jags scored first in the first quarter when Josh Lambo kicked a 32-yard field goal to make it 3–0.  They would make it 10–0 in the second quarter when Blake Bortles found Marqise Lee on a 3-yard pass.  The Bengals got on the board coming within 3 as Joe Mixon ran for a 7-yard touchdown making the score 10–7.  However, the Jags pulled away with Lambo's 56-yard field goal to make it 13–7 at halftime.  In the second half it was all Jags as they scored in the third quarter with Lambo hitting his third field goal of the day from 25 yards out to make it 16–7.  In the fourth quarter, they would wrap up the scoring of the game with Jaydon Mickens 63-yard punt return for a touchdown and the final score 23–7.

With the loss, the Bengals fell to 3–5.

The game was notable seeing A. J. Green getting ejected in the second quarter after fighting with Jacksonville's Jalen Ramsey, who was also ejected.

Week 10: at Tennessee Titans

After a tough loss, the Bengals traveled further north to take on the Titans.  The Titans drew first blood in the first quarter when DeMarco Murray ran for a 2-yard touchdown to make it 7–0.  The Bengals then got on the board when Andy Dalton found Brandon LaFell on a 37-yard pass (with a failed PAT) to make it 7–6.  The Titans managed to pull away in the second quarter when Murray ran for a 2-yard touchdown to make it 14–6.  The Bengals came within 1 again when Joe Mixon ran for a 3-yard touchdown to make it 14–13.  The Titans then closed out the half with Ryan Succop's 44-yard field goal to make it 17–13 at halftime.  After a scoreless third quarter, the Bengals took the lead in the fourth quarter when Dalton found A. J. Green on a 70-yard pass to make it 20–17.  Though the Titans were able to complete the comeback when Murray ran for his third touchdown of the day:  From 7 yards out to make it 24–20 sealing the win.

With the loss, the Bengals fell to 3–6.

Week 11: at Denver Broncos

After a tough road loss, the Bengals traveled west to take on the Broncos.  In the first quarter, they would score first when Andy Dalton found Tyler Kroft on a 1-yard pass (with a failed PAT) to make it 6–0.  The Broncos then took the lead when C.J. Anderson ran for a 3-yard touchdown to make it 7–6.  In the second quarter, the Bengals moved back into the lead when Dalton found Alex Erickson on a 29-yard pass to make it 13–7 at halftime.  In the third quarter, the Broncos came within 3 when Brandon McManus kicked a 45-yard field goal to make it 13–10.  Though in the fourth quarter, the Bengals moved up by double digits when Dalton found A. J. Green on an 18-yard pass to make it 20–10.  The Broncos then concluded the scoring of the game when Brock Osweiler found Demaryius Thomas on a 17-yard pass to make the final score 20–17.

With the win, the Bengals improved to 4–6.  The team also won against the Broncos in Denver for the first time since 1975.

Week 12: vs. Cleveland Browns

After winning on the road, the Bengals returned home for Game 2 of the Battle of Ohio.  In the first quarter, the Browns took an early lead when Zane Gonzalez kicked a 27-yard field goal to make it 3–0.  Though the Bengals took the lead when Andy Dalton found Tyler Boyd on an 8-yard pass to make it 7–3.  In the second quarter, the Bengals increased their lead with 3 straight field goals kicked by Randy Bullock:  From 31, 49, and 21 yards out to make the score 10–3, 13–3, and 16–3.  Gonzalez managed to get the Browns closer with a 21-yard field goal of his own to make it 16–6 at halftime.  In the third quarter, the Bengals pulled away as Dalton found Tyler Kroft on a 1-yard pass to make it 23–6.  Gonzalez managed to put to get the Browns within 2 touchdowns when he kicked his third field goal of the game:  from 39 yards out to make it 23–9.  The Browns came within a touchdown when DeShone Kizer ran for a 3-yard touchdown to make it 23–16.  However, the Bengals sealed the game when Joe Mixon ran for an 11-yard touchdown to make the final score 30–16.

Against the Browns, Joe Mixon had a career day, rushing for 114 yards and a touchdown, the first 100-yard game of his young career. With the win and 7th straight over the Browns, the Bengals went to 5–6.

Week 13: vs. Pittsburgh Steelers

After winning on the road, the Bengals returned home for Game 2 against the Steelers.  The Bengals scored first in the first quarter when Randy Bullock kicked a 35-yard field goal to make it 3–0.  They would make it 10–0 later on in the quarter when Andy Dalton found A. J. Green on an 8-yard pass.  In the second quarter, the Bengals scored again when Dalton found Green again on a 15-yard pass to make it 17–0.  The Steelers got their only points of the first half when Chris Boswell kicked a 30-yard field goal to make it 17–3 at halftime.  In the third quarter, the Steelers were able to come within a touchdown when Ben Roethlisberger found Le'Veon Bell on a 35-yard pass to make it 17–10.  However, the Bengals moved back ahead by double digits when Bullock kicked a 41-yard field goal to make it 20–10.  In the fourth quarter, it was all Steelers when Boswell kicked a 37-yard field goal to make the score 20–13.  This would be followed up by tying the game at 20–20 when Roethlisberger found Antonio Brown on a 6-yard pass.  Finally, the Steelers were able to seal the victory with seconds left when Boswell kicked the game-winning 38-yard field goal to make the final score 23–20.

With their 6th straight loss to the Steelers, the Bengals fell to 5–7.

Week 14: vs. Chicago Bears

After a tough loss at home, the Bengals would remain at home for a game against the Bears.  In the first quarter, the Bears took an early lead when Jordan Howard ran for a 21-yard touchdown (with a failed PAT) to make it 6–0.  The Bengals however took the lead later on in the quarter when Andy Dalton found Brandon LaFell on a 14-yard pass to make it 7–6.  The Bears retook the lead in the second quarter when Mike Nugent kicked 2 field goals:  From 34 and 27 yards out to make it 9–7 and then 12–7 at halftime.  The Bears then shut out the Bengals the entire second half while they score themselves:  In the third quarter Mitchell Trubisky ran for a 4-yard touchdown to make it 19–7 for the only score of the third quarter.  In the fourth quarter, they wrapped up the scoring when Trubisky found Adam Shaheen on a 1-yard pass to make it 26–7.  Howard then ran for an 8-yard touchdown to make the final score 33–7.

With the loss, the Bengals dropped to 5–8.  The team is also assured their second straight non-winning season.

Week 15: at Minnesota Vikings

The Bengals traveled to Minneapolis to take on the Vikings.  The Vikes dominated the majority of the game starting in the first quarter when they scored 3 times:  Latavius Murray ran for a 1-yard touchdown, Eric Kendricks intercepted Andy Dalton and returned it 31 yards for a touchdown, and then Kai Forbath kicked a 53-yard field goal to make it 17–0.  They made it 24–0 in the second quarter before halftime when Case Keenum found Stefon Diggs on a 20-yard pass.  In the third quarter, Forbath put a 35-yard field goal through to make it 27–0 for the only score.  This would be followed up by Keenum finding Kyle Rudolph in the fourth quarter to make it 34–0.  The Bengals score the last points of the game when Giovani Bernard ran for a 7-yard touchdown to make the final score 34–7.

With the loss, the Bengals dropped to 5–9.  The team would have consecutive losing seasons for the first time since 2007 and 2008.  Andy Dalton also tied his career-high for most games started and lost in a single season.

Week 16: vs. Detroit Lions

After yet another blowout loss, the Bengals returned home to take on the Lions.  In the first quarter, the Lions scored when Matthew Stafford found Eric Ebron on a 33-yard pass to make it 7–0.  The Bengals scored 2 field goals in the second quarter:  Randy Bullock got them from 29 and 27 yards out to make the score 7–3 and then 7–6 at halftime.  In the third quarter, Matt Prater put the Lions up by 4 with a 23-yard field goal to make it 10–6.  The Bengals however took the lead later on when Andy Dalton found C.J. Uzomah on a 1-yard pass to make it 13–10.  Bullock then put a 35-yard field goal through to make it 16–10.  The Lions retook the lead when Tion Green ran for a 5-yard touchdown to make it 17–16.  Though, the Bengals were able to score twice to seal the game:  Bullock kicked a 51-yard field goal to make it 19–17.  This would be followed by Giovani Bernard running for a 12-yard touchdown to make the final score 26–17.

With the win, the Bengals would improve to 6–9 and would knock the Detroit Lions out of the postseason.

Week 17: at Baltimore Ravens

The Bengals then closed out the regular season with Game 2 against the Ravens.  In the first quarter, the Bengals scored when Andy Dalton found Tyler Kroft on a 1-yard pass to make it 7–0 for the only score.  The Ravens got on the board in the second quarter when Justin Tucker nailed a 46-yard field goal to make it 7–3.  However, Dalton and Kroft connected again on a 5-yard pass to make it 14–3.  This would be followed up by Randy Bullock kicking a 32-yard field goal to make it 17–3 in favor of the Bengals.  The Ravens then closed out the half when Joe Flacco found Chris Moore on a 6-yard pass to make the halftime score 17–10.  In the third quarter, the Bengals moved back ahead by double digits when Darqueze Dennard returned an interception 89 yards for a touchdown to make it 24–10.  Though, the Ravens reduced that lead again when Alex Collins ran for a 17-yard touchdown to make it 24–17.  In the fourth quarter, the Ravens managed to take the lead when Tucker kicked a 34-yard field goal to make it 24–20 followed up by Flacco connecting with Mike Wallace on a 6-yard pass to make it 27–24.  Though, the Bengals were able to complete the comeback when Dalton found Tyler Boyd on a 49-yard pass to make the final score 31–27.

The Bengals spoiled their division rival's playoff hopes thanks to a late Andy Dalton touchdown pass to Tyler Boyd. Due to the tiebreakers, and after a 4th down pass from Flacco to Wallace fell a few yards short of converting to a first down, the win also allowed the Buffalo Bills to end their 17-year postseason drought, as they would qualify for the playoffs for the first time since 1999.

The team finished 7–9.

Standings

Division

Conference

References

External links
 

Cincinnati
Cincinnati Bengals seasons
Cincinnati Bengals